René Revol (born  in La Mure, Isère) is a French politician and a member of the Left Party (PG). He is mayor of Grabels, a working-class suburb of Montpellier (Hérault) since 2008.

A former member of the Socialist Party's left-wing, he joined Jean-Luc Mélenchon and Marc Dolez's Left Party in 2008.

In 2010, he was selected to be the Left Front's candidate in Languedoc-Roussillon for the 2010 regional elections. His list also received the support of the New Anticapitalist Party (NPA), despite negotiations between the NPA and Left Front failing nationally.

References

1947 births
Living people
People from La Mure
Socialist Party (France) politicians
Left Party (France) politicians
Mayors of places in Occitania (administrative region)